Alpine County Airport  is a county-owned public-use airport located three nautical miles (6 km) north of the central business district of Markleeville, in Alpine County, California, United States.

It is in the eastern Sierra Nevada range and serves as a general aviation airport. The airport has a single runway, with an apron to park small light aircraft. The airport has no buildings, no lights and is rarely used, averaging only 54 aircraft movements per month.

It is the only operational airport in Alpine County.

Facilities and aircraft 
It has one asphalt paved runway, designated 17/35, which measures 4,443 by 50 feet (1,354 x 15 m). For the 12-month period ending August 15, 2007, the airport had 650 aircraft operations, an average of 54 per month, all of which were general aviation.

The airport is closed during snow, due to no snow removal. Runway 17/35 is limited to 4800 lb single wheel and 9600 lb dual wheel aircraft.

References

External links 

California
Airports
Airports in California
Buildings and structures in Alpine County, California
Transportation in Alpine County, California